Vojislav "Vojo" Ubiparip (born 10 May 1988) is a Serbian professional footballer who plays as a striker.

Club career
A product of the Vojvodina youth system, Ubiparip made six appearances for the club in the 2006–07 Serbian SuperLiga. He also spent some time on loan at Proleter Novi Sad, Borac Čačak, ČSK Čelarevo, and Horgoš. In the summer of 2008, Ubiparip became a member of Spartak Subotica, helping them to promotion to the top flight in the 2008–09 season. He subsequently scored 10 goals in 25 games during the 2009–10 Serbian SuperLiga.

In January 2011, Ubiparip was transferred to Lech Poznań on a four-and-a-half-year contract. He made seven appearances and scored three goals in the 2014–15 Ekstraklasa, helping them win the title. In total, Ubiparip scored 12 league goals in 58 appearances for Lech Poznań.

In August 2015, Ubiparip signed a one-year deal with Hungarian club Vasas.

After Vasas, he also played for Novi Pazar, Górnik Łęczna and Željezničar. With Željezničar he won the 2017–18 Bosnian Cup.

On 6 September 2018, Ubiparip signed a two-and-a-half year contract with Tuzla City. Since signing with Tuzla City, he has been one of their most important players, scoring so far 31 goals in 71 league matches for the club over three seasons.

International career
A former Serbia U19 international, Ubiparip was capped twice for the Serbia under-21 team in 2010, scoring once.

Honours
Lech Poznań
Ekstraklasa: 2014–15
Željezničar
Bosnian Cup: 2017–18

Notes

References

External links

 
 
 
 
 

1988 births
Living people
Footballers from Novi Sad
Association football forwards
Ekstraklasa players
Expatriate footballers in Bosnia and Herzegovina
Expatriate footballers in Hungary
Expatriate footballers in Poland
FK Vojvodina players
FK Borac Čačak players
FK ČSK Čelarevo players
FK Novi Pazar players
FK Proleter Novi Sad players
FK Spartak Subotica players
Górnik Łęczna players
FK Željezničar Sarajevo players
FK Tuzla City players
Lech Poznań players
Nemzeti Bajnokság I players
Premier League of Bosnia and Herzegovina players
Serbia under-21 international footballers
Serbia youth international footballers
Serbian expatriate footballers
Serbian expatriate sportspeople in Bosnia and Herzegovina
Serbian expatriate sportspeople in Hungary
Serbian expatriate sportspeople in Poland
Serbian First League players
Serbian footballers
Serbian SuperLiga players
Vasas SC players